"Whatever You Like" is a song by the American rapper T.I., released as the lead single (second overall) from his sixth studio album, Paper Trail (2008). The song was written by T.I. and David Siegel, alongside the song's producer Jim Jonsin. "Whatever You Like" served as the third single from Paper Trail in the United Kingdom with a release date of June 1, 2009.

The song peaked at number one on the US Billboard Hot 100, giving T.I. his second US number one. It topped the chart for seven non-consecutive weeks, and remained in the top 3 of the charts for over 12 non-consecutive weeks. It was also number one in New Zealand and has been certified 3× Platinum by the RIAA. It was named the 16th most successful song from 2000 to 2009, on the Billboard Hot 100 Songs of the Decade.

Composition

"Whatever You Like" was written by T.I., James Scheffer and David Siegel. The song was produced by Jim Jonsin, who produced Lil Wayne's single, "Lollipop". The production team worked on the track when T.I. was in the studio recording his album. The instrumentals for "Whatever You Like" are based on a beat of lead synthesizers and drum pattern. The song runs for 4:09 and speaks about a man who can buy a woman whatever she asks for, as well encourages the woman to ask for anything she wants. A pop-rap song, contains a sample from "Redemption", the opening and closing theme song from the film Rocky II. "Whatever You Like" is set in common time with a moderately slow tempo of 80 beats per minute, and is written in the key of D minor with a chord progression sequence of Dm-Bb-F-C.

A second version of "Whatever You Like" was released in order to be suitable for radio stations. The original version of the track features T.I. saying "Late night sex so wet, it's so tight", while the radio version replaces these lyrics with the line "Baby I can treat you so special, so nice" in the hook and replacing the line "Thing gets so wet/ it hits so right" with "Girl, you smell so fresh, and look so nice" in the breakdown. The line "Tell 'em other broke niggas be quiet" with "Tell 'em other broke jokers be quiet" in the pre-hook, and the 2nd verse also censors the word "brain" in the line "Brain so good/ could've sworn you went to college" due to being a slang term for oral sex. The music video uses the edited lyrics.

Critical reception
"Whatever You Like" received generally favorable reviews. Jared W. Dillon of Sputnikmusic called the song a "more sophisticated take" on Lil Wayne's "Lollipop". Ian Cohen of Pitchfork Media noted that the song contained virtually no rapping while praising the synth-driven beat. Blender magazine ranked the song number 14 their Top 144 Songs of 2008 and number 18 on MTV's Commercially Released Hip-Hop Singles.

Chart performance
"Whatever You Like" debuted at number 99 on the Billboard Hot 100. In its third week, it achieved the biggest leap to number one in Billboard Hot 100 chart history when it jumped 70 positions, from number 71 to the top of the chart, breaking the record previously held by Maroon 5's "Makes Me Wonder", which jumped 64 to number one. It became T.I.'s first solo Hot 100 number one of his career and his second overall following the Justin Timberlake song "My Love" where T.I. was a featured artist. The song's jump can be largely attributed to huge first week digital sales of 205,000, debuting at number one on Billboard'''s Hot Digital Songs chart. The song held the number one position on the Hot 100 for three consecutive weeks, before being replaced by Pink's "So What." The following week the song knocked off "So What" to return to number one on the Hot 100, marking its fourth week overall at the top of the chart. It remained there for another week, marking its 5th week overall. The next week T.I. replaced himself at number one with the follow-up single "Live Your Life" which hadn't been done since Usher in 2004 with the first and second singles off his album (Yeah! and Burn). After spending two weeks at number two on the Hot 100, "Whatever You Like" again topped the chart by knocking off "Womanizer" by Britney Spears, marking its 6th non-consecutive week at number one on the Hot 100. This was the first time a song returned to number one on the chart after the artist's follow up single had already spent time at number one ("Live Your Life" having already spent a week at number one). It is also only the third song to ever have three separate runs at number one on the Hot 100, following Chic's "Le Freak" in 1979 and Leona Lewis' "Bleeding Love" earlier in 2008. The song retained the number one position the following week, bringing its total to seven non-consecutive weeks at number one. As of August 2013 it has sold 4,347,000 digital copies in the United States.

On the Hot R&B/Hip-Hop Songs chart, "Whatever You Like" has peaked at number one, giving T.I. his thirteenth top ten on the chart, and second number one song. It has also reached number three on the Pop 100, giving T.I. his biggest solo pop hit. The song has become T.I.'s biggest radio hit as well, reaching number one on the Hot 100 Airplay chart, and number four so far on Mainstream Top 40. Overall it has topped over nine different Billboard charts.

Internationally, "Whatever You Like" debuted at number twenty-two on the Canadian Hot 100 and has thus far risen to number twelve.  It made a strong debut on the Irish Singles Chart at number nineteen. In Australia, on the ARIA Singles Chart, it has so far peaked at number 15 and on the digital track chart at number 15. In New Zealand, the song made a massive jump from number 32 to number eight on the official RIANZ Chart. The following week it became his first number one in New Zealand and are certified by Platinum in that country. It also debuted at number sixty on the UK Singles Chart and peaked at number forty-seven due to strong download sales. It will be re-released as a full CD single release on 1 June 2009 and has been added to the B-list at BBC Radio 1.

Music video

The music video was filmed in Malibu, Los Angeles, California, and was directed by Dave Meyers. Reagan Gomez-Preston plays T.I.'s love interest. Cameos include Jackie Long, Lil Duval, Jim Jonsin, DJ Toomp and T.I.'s wife Tameka Cottle. The video starts with a girl working at a fast food restaurant. When T.I. comes into the restaurant, after ordering hot wings, he hands the girl a folded up paper with his number on it. She then calls him and T.I. invites her to his house. The video then shows her living the high life, with T.I. treating her to private jet rides, fancy dinners, and buying her many expensive gifts, such as a new car. The video also show clips of her living her normal life with her boyfriend. Right before the end of the video, it shows the release date of T.I.'s new album Paper Trail while T.I. is on the red carpet with his girl. At the end it is revealed it is all merely a fantasy sequence the girl was having, and T.I. had only handed the girl a hundred dollar bill, not his number. The concept of the video is similar to the one for Jay-Z's single "Excuse Me Miss".

Other versions
Trey Songz has remixed this on his mixtape Nothing Is Safe.
There is a remix which features Gorilla Zoe and another one that features Flo Rida. There is also a female version featuring Foxy Brown and Trina. 
 A Reggaeton version was made by Puerto Rican singer Yomo. This is an unofficial remix.
 Lil Wayne created a freestyle for his mixtape Dedication 3 titled "Whoever You Like".
S.L.M. covered the song for their album "S.L.M. (Sounds Like Music)" released in 2008.
Joan As Police Woman covered the song for her album "Cover" in 2010.
 Anya Marina, a singer-songwriter based in San Diego, California, released a cover version with slightly edited lyrics on Jul 7, 2009. This version was featured on an episode of CW's hit TV series Gossip Girl.
A parody, also called "Whatever You Like", was recorded by "Weird Al" Yankovic and released on October 8, 2008.
Students from Ron Clark Academy performed a remake of the song about the 2008 U.S. Presidential election called "Vote However You Like". Their performance on CNN was posted on YouTube, drawing national attention with over 2 million views. After learning of the students' remake of his song, T.I. paid a surprise visit to the Academy to watch their performance in person.
A special version with different lyrics was made for Red Ribbon Week.
 Alphacat released another version called "I Can Do Whatever I Like" to YouTube on November 4, 2008, portraying Barack Obama, who won the Presidential election in 2008.
 A Ska-punk cover of this song was recorded by BAMF! and was released as a single on iTunes on December 18, 2009
 YouTube artist Rucka Rucka Ali recorded a parody called "I Can Do Whatever I'm White" in 2008, the music video also featured T.I. speaking at the end of the song "I Can Do Whatever I'm White".
 Taco & Da Mofos covered this song on their 2009 album Bump Star Revolution''.
 Chief Greenbud did a parody of this song called "Smoke As Much" as you like.
 In 2020, US president Donald Trump repurposed the song in a campaign against Joe Biden, altering the lyrics on his Snapchat from "I want yo’ body, need yo’ body/Long as you got me you won't need nobody," to "I don't want Joe Biden, need Joe Biden/As long as you got me you won't need Joe Biden." A representative for T.I. responded by criticizing Trump for "unauthorized use" of the song and stated that it falsely suggested endorsement of the president or an attack towards Biden from T.I.

Track listing
Digital single

Charts

Weekly charts

Year-end charts

Decade-end charts

All-time charts

Certifications

See also
 List of number-one singles from the 2000s (New Zealand)
 List of Billboard Hot 100 number-one singles of 2008
 List of R&B number-one singles of 2008 (U.S.)

References

External links

2008 singles
2008 songs
T.I. songs
Grand Hustle Records singles
Music videos directed by Dave Meyers (director)
Billboard Hot 100 number-one singles
Number-one singles in New Zealand
Song recordings produced by Jim Jonsin
Songs written by Jim Jonsin
Songs written by T.I.
Internet memes
Pop-rap songs